Tongatapu 10 is an electoral constituency for the Legislative Assembly in the Kingdom of Tonga. It was established for the November 2010 general election, when the multi-seat regional constituencies for People's Representatives were replaced by single-seat constituencies, electing one representative via the first past the post electoral system. Located on the country's main island, Tongatapu, it encompasses the villages of Lapaha, Talasiu, Hoi, Nukuleka, Makaunga, Talafo‘ou, Navutoka, Manuka, Kolonga, Afa, Niutoua, and ‘Eueiki.

Its first ever representative was Semisi Tapueluelu, a first time MP, representing the Democratic Party of the Friendly Islands. He lost the seat to Pōhiva Tuʻiʻonetoa at the 2014 election. Tuʻiʻonetoa would represent this constituency until April 2022, when he was stripped of the seat by the Supreme Court for bribery.

Members of Parliament

Election results

2010

2014
Along with five other incumbent DPFI MPs, Semisi Tapueluelu was not selected as a DPFI candidate for this election, and announced he would be running as an independent candidate.

References

Tongan legislative constituencies
Tongatapu
2010 establishments in Tonga
Constituencies established in 2010